The Family Next Door is a 1939 American comedy film starring Hugh Herbert, Joy Hodges, Eddie Quillan and Ruth Donnelly.

Cast

 Hugh Herbert as George Pierce
 Joy Hodges as Laura Pierce
 Eddie Quillan as Sammy Pierce
 Ruth Donnelly as Mrs. Pierce
 Benny Bartlett as Rufus Pierce
 Juanita Quigley as Susan Pierce
 Thomas Beck as Bill Trevis
 Cecil Cunningham as Cora Stewart
 James Bush as Harold Warner
 Frances Robinson as Jane Hughes
 Lillian Yarbo as Blossom
 Dorothy Arnold as Cashier
 Mark Daniels as Bill Dillon (as Stanley Hughes)

References

External links

American black-and-white films
American comedy films
Films directed by Joseph Santley
1939 comedy films
1939 films
1930s American films